Pelican Butte is a steep-sided dormant shield volcano in the Cascade Range of southern Oregon. Ice age glaciers carved a large cirque into the northeast flank of the mountain, forming a steep bowl which is popular in winter with backcountry skiers and snowmobilers. Several proposals have been made over the last few decades for ski area development on the northeast flanks, but none of the proposals has obtained the regulatory approval from the United States Forest Service necessary to proceed with construction.

The land is in the Fremont-Winema National Forest and a Forest Service fire lookout tower was built on the summit in 1935, and upgraded several times over the ensuing decades. It was replaced in 1986 with a modern  steel tower, which remains to this day and is festooned with a large array of microwave and radio antennas.

Geography 
Pelican Butte is located in Klamath County, Oregon. It is disconnected from the main axis of the Cascade Range, having formed above a network of normal faults that mark the eastern border of the Cascades.

Pelican Butte has steep sides and despite erosion from glaciers, its original shape is mostly preserved. During the Pleistocene epoch, glaciers formed a canyon and a cirque on the northeastern side of the volcano; they also reduced the summit elevation several tens of meters and carved out an intrusive conduit in the volcano. It is about 33 percent larger than Mount McLoughlin, which lies to its west. Pelican Butte is the most prominent shield volcano in the southern Oregon Cascades.

Ecology 
On the volcano, at about  elevation, Douglas fir and Pondersora pine trees dominate. In a study of relationships between the northern spotted owl and its prey species, scientists identified animals including the Northern flying squirrel, Bushy-tailed woodrat, and voles as living at Pelican Butte. Less common animals that served as prey included Deer mice and Townsend's chipmunk as well as insects.

Geology 
Pelican Butte is a shield volcano. It sits on basaltic andesite erupted during the Pliocene and early Pleistocene epochs. Samples from the volcano have 58 to 60 percent silica, and the volcano is made up of calc-alkaline basaltic andesite and andesite lava with normal polarity. For the lower volcano, thick lava flows followed existing channels forming glassy deposits with phenocrysts including plagioclase, augite, hypersthene, and olivine. These phenocrysts are relatively sparse among the lava flows. A second type of andesitic lava created thinner flows with blocks and scoria closer to the summit of the volcano. With a finer grain and vesicular texture, the lava has phenocrysts of white plagioclase with sodic labradorite as well as olivine, augite, and hypersthene. It is believed that the volcano is made up of breccia based on eroded areas with breccia between lava flows, though breccia is not well-exposed elsewhere on the mountain. The summit of Pelican Butte has a cinder cone. 

Eruptive material at the volcano includes basalt and andesite, with minerals including plagioclase feldspar, olivine, clinopyroxene, and orthopyroxene. Along the southwestern flank of the volcano, pyroxene basaltic andesite deposits form outcrops that have been weathered into spheres. One deposit with block lava has a vesicular texture with zeolite. In general, basaltic andesite deposits are 75–80% plagioclase, 8–10% clinopyroxene, and 8–10% orthopyroxene, with olivine ranging from 2–5%, typically in an altered form as iddingsite. There is one distinct geochemical sample with a higher nickel and chromium content than other lava erupted by the volcano, which may reflect heterogeneity in the source for the erupted material.

A fault scarp sits adjacent to lava flows on the western flank of the volcano, though the fault did not move the deposits, suggesting this lava was erupted 1.17 million years ago.

Eruptive history 
Pelican Butte last erupted within the past 700,000 years. Dating for its last eruptive activity is unclear; it has clearly not erupted since it was covered by glaciers about 12,000 years ago, though it probably has not erupted for 60,000 years. According to Wood and Kienle (1990), most eruptions took place less than 200,000 years ago. However, Gorman (1994) reports that K–Ar dating of the summit places the volcano at 540,000 years old. According to the Global Volcanism Program, Pelican Butte has not erupted since the Pleistocene.

Eruptions at Pelican Butte built a summit cone with tuff breccia and lapilli during pyroclastic eruptive activity, which was mostly covered by lava flows before it was eroded over time by glaciation, which lowered the cone's elevation significantly. Eruptive activity at Pelican Butte was mildly explosive, later switching to thinner flows with ʻaʻā and block lava.

Human history 
Pelican Butte is named after nearby Pelican Bay. It was also known by American Indians as Mongina; the U.S. Coast and Geodetic Survey previously listed it under the name Lost Peak.

Recreation 

A gravel road runs all the way to the summit of the mountain, branching north off Oregon Route 140. The road is only open during snow-free months during the summer. The last few miles of the road are steep and narrow, but they are accessible by vehicles with high ground clearance. The peak of Pelican Butte offers a 180 degree view of the Cascades stretching from south of Crater Lake to Mount McLoughlin. A winter use trail for the volcano is operated by the Klamath Basin Snowdrifters Snowmobile Club.

Notes 

References

Sources

External links
 

Buttes of Oregon
Shield volcanoes of the United States
Subduction volcanoes
Cascade Volcanoes
Volcanoes of Oregon
Mountains of Oregon
Landmarks in Oregon
Cascade Range
Fire lookout towers in Oregon
Dormant volcanoes
Mountains of Klamath County, Oregon
Fremont–Winema National Forest
Volcanoes of Klamath County, Oregon
Pleistocene shield volcanoes